Frankenroda is a municipality in Wartburgkreis, Thuringia, Germany.

References

Wartburgkreis
Saxe-Coburg and Gotha